Bernardin is both a given name and a surname. Notable people with the name include:

Given name:
Bernardin-François Fouquet (1705–1785), French Catholic prelate, Cardinal, abbot and archbishop of Embrun
Bernardin Frankopan (1453–1529), Croatian nobleman, diplomat and warrior
Bernardin Gantin (1922–2008), Beninese cardinal
Bernardin Gigault de Bellefonds (1630–1694), French nobleman, soldier and courtier
Bernardin Matam (born 1990), French weightlifter 
Bernardin Mungul Diaka (1933–1999), Prime Minister of Zaire
Bernardin Palaj (1894–1947),  Franciscan cleric, folklorist and poet
Bernardin Pavlović (18th century), Croatian Franciscan writer
Jacques-Henri Bernardin de Saint-Pierre (1737–1814), French writer and botanist

Surname:
Jacques-Henri Bernardin de Saint-Pierre (1737–1814), French writer and botanist
Al Bernardin (1928–2009), American restaurateur and businessman
François Bernardin Azaïs (1870–1986), French missionary and archeologist 
Giorgio Bernardin (1928–2011), retired Italian footballer
Joseph Bernardin (1928–1996), American cardinal
Marc Bernardin (born 1971), American journalist, TV writer

Other uses 
Bernardin (agriculture), brand of  tractors, combines and implements are manufactured in San Vincente, Argentina
Bernardin-Johnson House, a historic home located at Evansville, Indiana

See also
Le Bernardin
Bernardin (agriculture)
 Bernardini

Masculine given names